Omeonga is a town in the Sankuru province of the Democratic Republic of the Congo. The Lomami river also passes nearby.

Chiefs or possessors of the name Omeonga are considered noble. It is also a name meaning "Man of Pillars" or "Noble".

Impact structure

The town lies near the center of a 30 km diameter depression, which is a proposed but unconfirmed ancient impact structure called the "Wembo-Nyama ring structure". The roundness of the ring is underlined by a tributary of the Lomami river. A similar visual effect can be seen with Manicouagan impact structure in central Quebec, Canada, where a ring of water surrounds the central René-Levasseur Island.

See also
 Siljan Ring
 List of possible impact structures on Earth

References

External links 

Google Earth view of Omeonga and around

Populated places in Sankuru